Iwantja is an Aboriginal community in the Anangu Pitjantjatjara Yankunytjatjara in South Australia.

See also
Indulkana Anangu School

References

Towns in South Australia
Aboriginal communities in South Australia
Anangu Pitjantjatjara Yankunytjatjara